The 1993–94 English Premiership, known at the time as the 1993–94 Courage League was the seventh season of competitive rugby union in England. Each team played each other twice, in a round robin system. Bath were the champions, beating Leicester Tigers by six points. Newcastle Gosforth and London Irish were relegated.

Participating teams

Table

Results
The Home Team is listed in the left column.

References

External links
Official website

Premiership Rugby seasons
 
English